Fossil Fighters: Champions in Japan, is a 2010 video game developed by Nintendo SPD, Red Entertainment, M2, and Artdink and published by Nintendo. The game is a sequel to its original title, Fossil Fighters. It was released in Japan on November 18, 2010 and in North America on November 14, 2011. It features the first 100 vivosaurs from the original game, as well as new vivosaurs.

Gameplay

Fossil Fighters: Champions follows the first game very closely, adding a few small items but keeping the framework of the previous game. Gameplay consists of collecting fossils to revive them into monsters known as "vivosaurs", and using them to battle other vivosaurs. Players will gain fossils by purchasing them in shops, obtaining as rewards for quests, or digging them up in specified locations indicated by a sonar. Two new fossil rocks are added; the Wonderous Fossil rock that changes color and improves a Vivosaurs stats and the Miraculous Fossil rock that evolves it into a new form.

Cleaning 
Fossils must be cleaned before they are able to be revived. The player uses either a hammer or a chisel, each with different strengths and weaknesses, in a cleaning minigame using the DS touchscreen to remove the surrounding rock. The minigame has a ninety-second time limit as well as a meter to show how much of the fossil is revealed and how severely damaged it is. Two new types of fossil rock are added from the previous game. Giant fossil rocks contain all four fossils for a particular vivosaur in one complete skeleton. The other are odd fossil rocks which have two sides, allowing the player to flip between them while cleaning.

Revival 
Getting the head fossil is mandatory to revive a creature, while the other three parts serve to make it considerably stronger. Many vivosaurs return from the original game. Newly added vivosaurs include mollusks, mammoths, and sabre tooth tigers.

Battle 
Fossil Fighters: Champions uses the same battle system as its predecessor. Along with an associated element, Vivosaurs are categorized by what range they best attack at: short, medium, and long range. Both sides are able to rotate their three players on the playfield to move their vivosaurs into their strongest range to maximize damage. The team who has the higher total speed goes first in a battle, as opposed to the previous game, in which the team with the lower total LP goes first.

Added features 
The player can now play as a girl instead of the default boy and choose from four different starting vivosaurs. The game also adds the toggle for Auto Battle as well as the ability to rotate own team. Players can now unearth rare gold fossils that can be used to "super evolve" certain vivosaurs into new forms.

Plot 
In the beginning of the game, after having rescued protagonist and their squeamish best friend Todd, Joe Wildwest, proud owner of Caliosteo Island, organizes the Caliosteo Cup, a tournament in which participants battle with vivosaurs. The BareBones Brigade, lead by the skeletal Don Boneyard and having Kole, Lester, and Lola as lieutenants, tries to stop the tournament, but Joe Wildwest organizes the hero and their friends into the Patrol Team to counter this threat. These other friends are Pauleen, a Digadig girl who wears a magic mask to feel more confident, and Rupert, a slightly egotistical boy who's the son of a wealthy man. 

During the finals, Joe Wildwest reveals himself to be in fact a sorcerer named Zongazonga and tries to possess the Hero but is foiled by Don Boneyard, who reveals himself to be the real Joe Wildwest, who helps the Hero escape. When the Hero confronts him with the Caliosteo Pipsqueak, a tool used to detach Zongazonga from his body, he knocks it out of the hero's hands into the wind and challenges the Hero to a Fossil Battle. He loses, and the Hero knocks Zongazonga out of Joe's body. However, he escapes with Rupert and possesses his body. Zongazonga then summons his castle where the Hero faces him, and Zongazonga is defeated. He separates from Rupert and transforms into a Zombie Vivosaur form, and is defeated again. Zongazonga's skull is broken and sealed, and his castle is destroyed. The Hero and Rupert are then rescued by Todd and Pauleen.

Reception 
Fossil Fighters: Champions received a score of 68/100 on Metacritic. IGN gave it a 7.5/10, calling the fossil cleaning mechanic "fun" and enjoyable for fans of dinosaurs or of the previous game, while RPGamer and GameSpot criticize the similarity without improvement, giving the game a 6.5/10 and 3.5/5 respectively.

Notes

References

External links
 Official website 
 Official website 

2010 video games
Artdink games
Dinosaurs in video games
Fossil Fighters
Multiplayer and single-player video games
Nintendo DS games
Nintendo DS-only games
Nintendo Wi-Fi Connection games
Red Entertainment games
Role-playing video games
Video game sequels
Video games developed in Japan